Crimean–Congo hemorrhagic fever (CCHF) is a viral disease. Symptoms of CCHF may include fever, muscle pains, headache, vomiting, diarrhea, and bleeding into the skin. Onset of symptoms is less than two weeks following exposure. Complications may include liver failure. In those who survive, recovery generally occurs around two weeks after onset.

The CCHF virus is typically spread by tick bites or close contact with the blood, secretions, organs or other bodily fluids of infected persons or animals. Groups that are at high risk of infection are farmers and those who work in slaughterhouses. The virus can also spread between people via body fluids. Diagnosis can be made by detecting antibodies, the virus's RNA, or viral proteins (antigens). It is a type of viral hemorrhagic fever.

There are no FDA- or WHO-approved therapeutics for CCHF. Prevention involves avoiding tick bites, using safe practices in meat processing plants, and observing universal healthcare precautions. A vaccine is not commercially available. Treatment is typically with supportive care. The medication ribavirin may also help.

CCHF cases are observed in a wide geographic range including Africa, Russia, the Balkans, the Middle East, and Asia. Typically small outbreaks are seen in areas where the virus is endemic. In 2013 Iran, Russia, Turkey, and Uzbekistan documented more than 50 cases. The fatality rate is typically between 10 and 40%, though fatalities as high as 80% have been observed in some outbreaks. The virus was first observed in Crimea in the 1940s and was later identified as the same agent of what had been called Congo Hemorrhagic Fever.
 In the past 20 years, CCHF outbreaks have reported in Eastern Europe, particularly in the former Soviet Union, throughout the Mediterranean, in northwestern China, central Asia, southern Europe, Africa, the Middle East, and the Indian subcontinent. CCHF is on WHO’s priority list for Research and Development and the US National Institute of Allergy and Infectious Diseases (NIH/NIAID) priority A list, as a disease posing the highest level of risk to national security and public health.

Signs and symptoms
The clinical illness associated with CCHFV is a severe form of hemorrhagic fever. Following infection by a tick bite, the incubation period is typically two to three days but can last as long as nine days, while the incubation period following contact with infected blood or tissues is usually five to six days with a documented maximum of 13 days. The onset of symptoms ushering in the pre-hemorrhagic phase is sudden, with fever, myalgia, (muscle ache), dizziness, neck pain and stiffness, backache, headache, Suhash disease, sore eyes and photophobia (sensitivity to light). Typical symptoms include nausea, vomiting (which may progress to severe bleeding and can be fatal if not treated), diarrhea, abdominal pain and sore throat early in the acute infection phase, followed by sharp mood swings, agitations and confusion. After several days, agitation may be replaced by sleepiness, depression and lassitude, and the abdominal pain may localize to the upper right quadrant, with detectable liver enlargement. As the illness progresses into the hemorrhagic phase, large areas of severe bruising, severe nosebleeds, and uncontrolled bleeding at injection sites can be seen, beginning on about the fourth day of illness and lasting for about two weeks. Other clinical signs include tachycardia (fast heart rate), lymphadenopathy (enlarged lymph nodes), and a petechiae (a rash caused by bleeding into the skin) on internal mucosal surfaces, such as in the mouth and throat, and on the skin. The petechiae may give way to larger rashes called ecchymoses, and other haemorrhagic phenomena. There is usually evidence of hepatitis, and severely ill patients may experience rapid kidney deterioration, liver failure or pulmonary failure after the fifth day of illness.

In documented outbreaks of CCHF, fatality rates in hospitalized patients have ranged from 9% to as high as 70%, though the WHO notes a typical range of 10–40%, with death often occurring in the second week of illness. In patients who recover, improvement generally begins on the ninth or tenth day after the onset of illness. The long-term effects of CCHF infection have not been studied well enough in survivors to determine whether or not specific complications exist. However, recovery is slow.

Cause

Virology

The Crimean–Congo hemorrhagic fever orthonairovirus (CCHFV) is a member of the genus Orthonairovirus, family Nairoviridae of RNA viruses.

The virions are 80–120 nanometers (nm) in diameter and are pleomorphic. There are no host ribosomes within the virion. Each virion contains three distinct RNA sequences, which together make up the viral genome. The envelope is single layered and is formed from a lipid bilayer 5 nm thick. It has no external protrusions. The envelope proteins form small projections ~5–10 nm long. The nucleocapsids are filamentous and circular with a length of 200–3000 nm.
Viral entry is thought to be clathrin-mediated with the cell surface protein nucleolin playing a role.

Molecular biology
The genome is circular, negative sense RNA in three parts – Small (S), Medium (M) and Large (L). The L segment is 11–14.4 kilobases in length while the M and S segments are 4.4–6.3 and 1.7–2.1 kilobases long respectively. The L segment encodes the RNA polymerase, the M segment encodes the envelope glycoproteins (Gc and Gn), and the S segment encodes the nucleocapsid protein. The mutation rates for the three parts of the genome were estimated to be: 1.09, 1.52 and 0.58 substitutions/site/year for the S, M, and L segments respectively.

Population genetics
CCHFV is the most genetically diverse of the arboviruses: Its nucleotide sequences frequently differ between different strains, ranging from a 20% variability for the viral S segment to 31% for the M segment. Viruses with diverse sequences can be found within the same geographic area; closely related viruses have been isolated from widely separated regions, suggesting that viral dispersion has occurred possibly by ticks carried on migratory birds or through international livestock trade. Reassortment among genome segments during coinfection of ticks or vertebrates seems likely to have played a role in generating diversity in this virus.

Based on the sequence data, seven genotypes of CCHFV have been recognised: Africa 1 (Senegal), Africa 2 (Democratic Republic of the Congo and South Africa), Africa 3 (southern and western Africa), Europe 1 (Albania, Bulgaria, Kosovo, Russia and Turkey), Europe 2 (Greece), Asia 1 (the Middle East, Iran and Pakistan) and Asia 2 (China, Kazakhstan, Tajikistan and Uzbekistan).

Transmission

Ticks are both "environmental reservoir" and vector for the virus, carrying it from wild animals to domestic animals and humans. Tick species identified as infected with the virus include Argas reflexus, Hyalomma anatolicum, Hyalomma detritum, Hyalomma marginatum marginatum and Rhipicephalus sanguineus.
At least 31 different species of ticks from the genera Haemaphysalis and Hyalomma in southeastern Iran have been found to carry the virus.

Wild animals and small mammals, particularly European hare, Middle-African hedgehogs and multimammate rats are the "amplifying hosts" of the virus. Birds are generally resistant to CCHF, with the exception of ostriches. Domestic animals like sheep, goats and cattle can develop high titers of virus in their blood, but tend not to fall ill.

The "sporadic infection" of humans is usually caused by a Hyalomma tick bite. Animals can transmit the virus to humans, but this would usually be as part of a disease cluster. When clusters of illness occur, it is typically after people treat, butcher or eat infected livestock, particularly ruminants and ostriches. Outbreaks have occurred in abattoirs and other places where workers have been exposed to infected human or animal blood and fomites  Humans can infect humans and outbreaks also occur in clinical facilities through infected blood and unclean medical instruments.

Prevention

Where mammalian tick infection is common, agricultural regulations require de-ticking farm animals before transportation or delivery for slaughter. Personal tick avoidance measures are recommended, such as use of insect repellents, adequate clothing, and body inspection for adherent ticks.

When feverish patients with evidence of bleeding require resuscitation or intensive care, body substance isolation precautions should be taken.

Vaccine
Since the 1970s, several vaccine trials around the world against CCHF have been terminated due to high toxicity.

, the only available and probably somewhat efficacious CCHF vaccine has been an inactivated antigen preparation then used in Bulgaria. No publication in the scientific literature related to this vaccine exists, which a Turkish virologist called suspicious both because antiquated technology and mouse brain were used to manufacture it. 
More vaccines are under development, but the sporadic nature of the disease, even in endemic countries, suggests that large trials of vaccine efficacy will be difficult to perform. Finding volunteers may prove challenging, given growing anti-vaccination sentiment and resistance of populations to vaccination against contagious diseases. The number of people to be vaccinated, and the length of time they would have to be followed to confirm protection would have to be carefully defined. Alternatively, many scientists appear to believe that treatment of CCHF with ribavirin is more practical than prevention, but some recently conducted clinical trials appear to counter assumptions of drug efficacy.
In 2011, a Turkish research team led by Erciyes University successfully developed the first non-toxic preventive vaccine, which passed clinical trials. As of 2012, the vaccine was pending approval by the US FDA.

Since the Ebola epidemic, the WHO jumpstarted a "Blueprint for Research and Development preparedness" on emerging pathogens with epidemic potential, against which there are no medical treatments. CCHF was the top priority on the initial list from December 2015, and is second as of January 2017.

Treatment
Treatment is mostly supportive. Ribavirin has shown some efficacy in vitro and has been used by mouth during outbreaks, but there is uncertain evidence to support its use, and this medication can cause serious side effects including hemolytic anemia and liver damage.

 the use of Immunoglobulin preparations has remained unproven and antibody engineering, which raised hopes for monoclonal antibody therapy, has remained in its infancy.

Epidemiology

CCHF occurs most frequently among agricultural workers, following the bite of an infected tick, and to a lesser extent among slaughterhouse workers exposed to the blood and tissues of infected livestock, and medical personnel through contact with the body fluids of infected persons.

Geographic distribution
 the northern limit of CCHF has been 50 degrees northern latitude, north of which the Hyalomma ticks have not been found.
Per a WHO map from 2008, Hyalomma ticks occurred south of this latitude across all of the Eurasian continent and Africa, sparing only the islands of Sri Lanka, Indonesia and Japan. 
Serological or virological evidence of CCHF was widespread in Asia, Eastern Europe, the Middle East (except Israel, Lebanon and Jordan), central Africa, Western Africa, South Africa and Madagascar.

In 2008, more than 50 cases/year were reported from only 4 countries: Turkey, Iran, Russia and Uzbekistan. 5-49 cases/year were present in South Africa, Central Asia including Pakistan and Afghanistan (but sparing Turkmenistan), in the Middle East only the UAE and the Balkan countries limited to Romania, Bulgaria, Serbia, Montenegro and Albania.

In Russia, the disease is limited to Southern and North Caucasian Federal Districts, but climate change may cause it to spread into more northerly areas.

A 2014 map by the CDC shows endemic areas (in red) largely unchanged in Africa and the Middle East, but different for the Balkan, including all countries of the former Yugoslavia, and also Greece, but no longer Romania. India's Northwestern regions of Rajasthan and Gujarat saw their first cases.

Outbreaks
From 1995 to 2013, 228 cases of CCHF were reported in the Republic of Kosovo, with a case-fatality rate of 25.5%.

Between 2002–2008 the Ministry of Health of Turkey reported 3,128 CCHF cases, with a 5% death rate. In July 2005, authorities reported 41 cases of CCHF in central Turkey's Yozgat Province, with one death. As of August 2008, a total of 50 deaths were reported for the year thus far in various cities in Turkey due to CCHF.

In 2003, 38 people were infected with CCHF in Mauritania, including 35 residents of Nouakchott.

In September 2010, an outbreak was reported in Pakistan's Khyber Pakhtunkhwa province. Poor diagnosis and record keeping caused the extent of the outbreak to be uncertain, though some reports indicated over 100 cases, with a case-fatality rate above 10%.

In January 2011, the first human cases of CCHF in India was reported in Sanand, Gujarat, India, with 4 reported deaths, which included the index patient, treating physician and nurse.

, 71 people were reported to have contracted the disease in Iran, resulting in 8 fatalities.

In October 2012, a British man died from the disease at the Royal Free Hospital in London. He had earlier been admitted to Gartnavel General Hospital in Glasgow, after returning on a flight from Kabul in Afghanistan.

In July 2013, seven people died of CCHF in the Karyana village of Babra, Gujarat, India.

In August 2013, a farmer from Agago, Uganda was treated at Kalongo Hospital for a confirmed CCHF infection. The deaths of three other individuals in the northern region were suspected to have been caused by the virus. Another unrelated CCHF patient was admitted to Mulago Hospital on the same day. The Ministry of Health announced on the 19th that the outbreak was under control, but the second patient, a 27-year-old woman from Nansana, died on the 21st. She is believed to have contracted the virus from her husband, who returned to Kampala after being treated for CCHF in Juba, South Sudan.

In June 2014, cases were diagnosed in Kazakhstan. Ten people, including an ambulance crew, were admitted on to hospital in southern Kazakhstan with suspected CCHF. 
In July 2014 an 8th person was found to be infected with CCHF at Hayatabad Medical Complex (HMC), Pakistan. The eight patients, including a nurse and 6 Afghan nationals, died between April and July 2014.

, sporadic confirmed cases have been reported from Bhuj, Amreli, Sanand, Idar and Vadnagar in Gujarat, India. In November 2014, a doctor and a labourer in north Gujarat tested positive for the disease. In the following weeks, three more people died from CCHF. In March 2015, one more person died of CCHF in Gujarat.
As of 2015, among livestock, CCHF was recognized as "widespread" in India, only 4 years after the first human case had been diagnosed.

In August 2016, the first local case of CCHF in Western Europe occurred in Western Spain. A 62-year-old man, who had been bitten by a tick in Spain died on August 25, having infected a nurse. The tick bite occurred in the province of Ávila, 300 km away from the province of Cáceres, where CCHF viral RNA from ticks was amplified in 2010.  it was unclear what specific ecology led to the Spanish cases.

In August 2016, a number of Pakistani news sources raised concerns regarding the disease. Between January and October 2016, CCHF outbreaks in Pakistan were reported with highest numbers of cases and deaths during August 2016, just before the festival of Eid-al-Adha (held on September 13–15 in 2016). It was hypothesized that the festival could play an important part as people could come into contact with domestic or imported animals potentially infected with CCHF virus. The Pakistani NIH showed there was no correlation, and that CCHF cases
have coincided with the peak tick proliferation during the preceding 8–10 years.

In 2017, the General Directorate of Public Health in Turkey published official records of infections and casualties involving CCHF between 2008 and 2017. Cases declined form 1,318 in 2009 to 343 in 2017 alongside a lowered mortality rate. Cases are concentrated in rural areas of the Southern Black Sea Region, Central Anatolia Region, and Eastern Anatolia Region during early summer months.

On February 2, 2020, an outbreak was reported in Mali involving fourteen cases and seven deaths, days before the COVID-19 pandemic in Africa. In May 2020, a single case was reported in Mauritania.

In 2022, an outbreak occurred in Iraq. Between 1 January and 22 May, 212 cases of CCHF were reported to the WHO. Of the 212 cases, 115 were suspected and 97 laboratory confirmed. Twenty seven deaths were recorded, of which 13 were in laboratory confirmed cases.

History
In ancient Celtic settlements in the Upper Danube area in Germany, the CCHF virus was detected in archaeological blood samples, indicating that it was endemic at the time. The virus may have evolved around 1500–1100 BC. It is thought that changing climate and agricultural practices around this time could be behind its evolution.

In the 12th century a case of a hemorrhagic disease reported from what is now Tajikistan may have been the first known case of Crimean–Congo hemorrhagic fever.

In 1944, roughly 200 Soviet military agricultural workers were infected by Crimean hemorrhagic fever (CHF), leading to experiments showing a tick-borne viral etiology.

In February 1967, virologists John P. Woodall, David Simpson, Ghislaine Courtois and others published initial reports on a virus they called the Congo virus. In 1956, the Congo virus had first been isolated by physician Ghislaine Courtois, head of the Provincial Medical Laboratory, Stanleyville, in the Belgian Congo. Strain V3010, isolated by Courtois, was sent to the Rockefeller Foundation Virus Laboratory (RFVL) in New York City and found to be identical to another strain from Uganda, but to no other named virus at that time.

In June 1967, Soviet virologist Mikhail Chumakov registered an isolate from a fatal case that occurred in Samarkand in the Catalogue of Arthropod-borne Viruses. In 1969, the Russian strain, which Chumakov had sent to the RFVL, was published to be identical to the Congo virus.

In 1973, the International Committee on Taxonomy of Viruses adopted Crimean–Congo hemorrhagic fever virus as the official name.

These reports include records of the occurrence of the virus or antibodies to the virus from ebola Greece, Portugal, South Africa, Madagascar (the first isolation from there), the Maghreb, Dubai, Saudi Arabia, Kuwait and Iraq.

References

External links 

 
 World Health Organization Fact Sheet

Arthropod-borne viral fevers and viral haemorrhagic fevers
Hemorrhagic fevers
Nairoviridae
Tick-borne diseases
Wikipedia medicine articles ready to translate
Wikipedia infectious disease articles ready to translate